The Glasgow City Council election of 2017 was held on 4 May 2017, the same day as the 31 other Scottish local government elections. The election was the first to use 23 new wards, created as a result of the Local Government Boundary Commission for Scotland's 5th Review. Each ward elected three or four councillors using the single transferable vote system, a form of proportional representation used since the 2007 election and according to the Local Governance (Scotland) Act 2004.

As predicted in the weeks leading up to the election, the Scottish Labour were replaced by the Scottish National Party as the largest party in the council, a first for the SNP and ending Labour's 37-year tenure of control, although the SNP were four seats short of an overall majority. The Scottish Conservatives gained seven seats, their best result since the 1984 election. This included some unexpected victories in wards such as Shettleston and Calton, some of Glasgow's most deprived areas in the east. The Scottish Greens also made gains to give them their best ever result in Glasgow's local elections, taking seven seats, two more than in 2012, and topping the first-preference vote in Hillhead to the west. The Scottish Liberal Democrats lost their only remaining seat, making this council the first without any Liberal representation since 1974.

On 18 May, the SNP formally took control of the council as a minority administration with SNP members filling the positions of council leader, depute council leader, and Lord Provost.

Election results

Note: "Votes" are the first preference votes. The net gain/loss and percentage changes relate to the result of the previous Scottish local elections on 3 May 2012. This may differ from other published sources showing gain/loss relative to seats held at dissolution of Scotland's councils.

Retiring Councillors

Ward summary

|- class="unsortable" align="centre"
!rowspan=2 align="left"|Ward
! % 
!Seats
! %
!Seats
! %
!Seats
! %
!Seats
! %
!Seats
! %
!Seats
!rowspan=2|Total
|- class="unsortable" align="center"
!colspan=2 | SNP
!colspan=2 | Labour
!colspan=2 | Conservative
!colspan=2 | Green
!colspan=2 | Lib Dem
!colspan=2 | Others
|-
|align="left"|Linn
|35.52
|2
|27.01
|1
|15.85
|1
|3.27
|0
|7.68
|0
|10.66
|0
|4
|-
|align="left"|Newlands/Auldburn
|40.08
|1
|28.57
|1
|21.97
|1
|5.81
|0
|3.57
|0
|0
|0
|3
|-
|align="left"|Greater Pollok
|40.55
|2
|38.17
|2
|13.94
|0
|2.35
|0
|1.54
|0
|3.45
|0
|4
|-
|align="left"|Cardonald
|43.34
|2
|37.80
|2
|11.68
|0
|2.52
|0
|1.97
|0
|2.69
|0
|4
|-
|align="left"|Govan
|43.73
|2
|31.59
|1
|11.41
|0
|9.32
|1
|2.19
|0
|1.76
|0
|4
|-
|align="left"|Pollokshields
|36.22
|1
|23.26
|1
|23.04
|1
|13.60
|1
|2.94
|0
|0.95
|0
|4
|-
|align="left"|Langside
|43.11
|2
|26.29
|1
|13.57
|0
|11.88
|1
|3.26
|0
|1.89
|0
|4
|-
|align="left"|Southside Central
|43.43
|2
|34.75
|2
|6.70
|0
|11.29
|0
|1.43
|0
|2.40
|0
|4
|-
|align="left"|Calton
|47.23
|2
|27.79
|1
|11.43
|1
|8.95
|0
|1.86
|0
|2.74
|0
|4
|-
|align="left"|Anderston/City/Yorkhill
|39.37
|2
|28.50
|1
|9.88
|0
|18.32
|1
|2.51
|0
|1.41
|0
|4
|-
|align="left"|Hillhead
|37.16
|1
|21.73
|1
|10.14
|0
|25.63
|1
|4.45
|0
|0.89
|0
|3
|-
|align="left"|Victoria Park
|36.44
|1
|19.97
|1
|23.69
|1
|13.50
|0
|5.78
|0
|0.61
|0
|3
|-
|align="left"|Garscadden/Scotstounhill
|44.87
|2
|33.75
|2
|12.20
|0
|5.05
|0
|2.20
|0
|1.93
|0
|4
|-
|align="left"|Drumchapel/Anniesland
|44.43
|2
|37.32
|2
|11.59
|0
|4.27
|0
|0
|0
|2.39
|0
|4
|-
|align="left"|Maryhill
|47.70
|2
|28.46
|1
|10.58
|0
|8.81
|0
|4.45
|0
|0
|0
|3
|-
|align="left"|Canal
|42.40
|2
|34.52
|2
|8.84
|0
|4.77
|0
|0.97
|0
|8.51
|0
|4
|-
|align="left"|Springburn/Robroyston
|43.06
|2
|39.70
|2
|10.36
|0
|3.44
|0
|1.29
|0
|2.15
|0
|4
|-
|align="left"|East Centre
|45.38
|2
|36.21
|2
|13.39
|0
|2.66
|0
|0
|0
|2.35
|0
|4
|-
|align="left"|Shettleston
|37.76
|2
|36.71
|1
|18.10
|1
|2.94
|0
|1.09
|0
|3.40
|0
|4
|-
|align="left"|Baillieston
|44.56
|1
|28.81
|1
|20.97
|1
|2.29
|0
|1.92
|0
|1.46
|0
|3
|-
|align="left"|North East
|39.63
|2
|35.18
|1
|12.14
|0
|2.36
|0
|0
|0
|10.68
|0
|3
|-
|align="left"|Dennistoun
|38.79
|1
|31.49
|1
|7.78
|0
|19.49
|1
|2.45
|0
|0
|0
|3
|-
|align="left"|Partick East/Kelvindale
|34.30
|1
|17.57
|1
|22.21
|1
|16.42
|1
|8.45
|0
|1.04
|0
|4
|- class="unsortable" class="sortbottom"
!align="left"| Total
!40.96
!39
!30.20
!31
!14.59
!8
!8.70
!7
!2.92
!0
!2.62
!0
!85
|}

Ward results

Ward 1: Linn
 2012 2 × Lab; 1 × SNP; 1 × Lib Dem
 2017 2 x SNP; 1 x Lab; 1 x Con
 2012–2017 Change SNP and Con gain each one seat from Lab and Lib Dem

Ward 2: Newlands/Auldburn
2012: 2 x Lab; 1 x SNP
2017: 1 x SNP; 1 x Lab; 1 x Con
2012-2017 Change: Con gain one seat from Lab

Ward 3: Greater Pollok
2012: 2 x Lab; 2 x SNP
2017: 2 x SNP; 2 x Lab
2012-2017 Change: No change

Ward 4: Cardonald
 2017: 2 x SNP; 2 x Lab
 2012-2017 Change: New ward

Ward 5: Govan
2012: 2 x Lab; 1 x SNP; 1 x GlasgowFirst
2017: 2 x SNP; 1 x Lab; 1 x Green
2012-2017 Change: SNP and Green gain each one seat from Lab and GlasgowFirst

Ward 6: Pollokshields
2012: 1 x Lab; 1 x SNP; 1 x Con 
2017: 1 x SNP; 1 x Con; 1 x Lab; 1 x Green 
2007-2012 Change: 1 additional seat compared to 2012, won by Green

Ward 7: Langside
2012: 1 x SNP; 1 x Lab; 1 x Green
2017: 2 x SNP; 1 x Lab; 1 x Green
2012-2017 Change: 1 additional seat compared to 2012, won by SNP

Ward 8: Southside Central
2012: 2 x Lab; 2 x SNP
2017: 2 x SNP; 2 x Lab 
2012-2017 Change: No change

Ward 9: Calton
2012: 2 x Lab; 1 x SNP
2017: 2 x SNP; 1 x Lab; 1 x Con
2007-2012 Change: 1 additional seat compared to 2012, won by Con

Ward 10: Anderston/City/Yorkhill
2012: 2 x Lab; 1 x SNP; 1 x Green 
2017: 2 x SNP; 1 x Lab; 1 x Green 
2012-2017 Change: SNP gain one seat from Lab

Ward 11: Hillhead
2012: 1 x SNP; 1 x Green; 2 x Lab
2017: 1 x Green; 1 x Lab; 1 x SNP
2012-2017 change: 1 less seat compared to 2012, lost by Lab

Ward 12: Victoria Park
2017: 1 x SNP; 1 x Con; 1 x Lab 
2012-2017 change: New ward

Ward 13: Garscadden/Scotstounhill
2012: 3 x Lab; 1 x SNP 
2017: 2 x Lab; 2 x SNP 
2012-2017 change: SNP gains one seat from Lab

Ward 14: Drumchapel/Anniesland
2007: 3 x Lab; 1 x SNP
2012: 2 x SNP; 2 x Lab
2007-2012 change: SNP gain one seat from Lab

Ward 15: Maryhill
2017: 2 x SNP; 1 x Lab 
2012-2017 change: New ward

Ward 16: Canal
2012: 2 x Lab; 1 x SNP; 1 x Green
2017: 2 x SNP; 2 x Lab 
2012-2017 change: SNP gain one seat from Green

Ward 17: Springburn/Robroyston
2017: 2 x Lab; 2 x SNP 
2012-2017 Change: New ward

Ward 18: East Centre
2012: 3 x Lab; 1 x SNP
2017: 2 x Lab; 2 x SNP 
2012-2017 changes: SNP gain one seat from Lab

Ward 19: Shettleston
2007: 3 x Lab; 1 x SNP 
2017: 2 x SNP; 1 x Lab; 1 x Con 
2012-2017 Change: Con and SNP gain each one seat from Lab

Ward 20: Baillieston
2012: 2 x Lab; 2 x SNP
2017: 1 x SNP; 1 x Lab; 1 x Con 
2012-2017 changes: 1 fewer seat than in 2012

Ward 21: North East
2012: 3 x Lab; 1 x SNP  
2017: 2 x SNP; 1 x Lab 
2012-2017 changes: SNP gain one seat from Lab

Ward 22: Dennistoun
2017: 1 x Lab; 1 x SNP; 1 x Green   
2012-2017 changes: New ward

Ward 23: Partick East/Kelvindale
2017: 1 x SNP; 1 x Con; 1 Lab; 1 x Green
2012-2017 change: New ward

Changes since 2017
† Cardonald ward Labour Cllr Alistair Watson died suddenly on 29 June 2017. A by-election was held on 7 September 2017 and was won by Jim Kavanagh of the Scottish Labour Party.
†† Linn ward SNP Cllr Glenn Elder resigned the party whip on 18 April 2019, claiming that the SNP group in Glasgow has "lost focus" and promotes a "hostile" environment.
††† East Centre ward SNP Cllr Russell Robertson resigned from the party on 26 April 2019, citing concerns over the leadership of the SNP and council leader Susan Aitken.
†††† Drumchapel/Anniesland ward Labour Cllr Anne McTaggart resigned from the party on 1 November 2019, and joined the SNP.
††††† Garscadden/Scotstounhill Cllr Michael Cullen resigned from the SNP on 10 July 2020, after being charged with fraud after wasting police time in connection with a sexual assault allegation.
†††††† Drumchapel/Anniesland Cllr Elspeth Kerr resigned from the SNP on 10 July 2020 after objecting to Cllr Michael Cullen's resignation from the party.
††††††† Partick East/Kelvindale ward Conservative Cllr Tony Curtis resigned from the party in July 2020 in protest for the party's lack of support for the fitness industry. He would sit as independent councillor until his disqualification on 11 January 2021. Curtis was disqualified after not attending council meetings for six months. A by-election for the seat was held on 18 March 2021. Labour candidate Jill Brown won the by-election.
†††††††† Baillieston ward Labour Cllr Jim Coleman was disqualified on 28 January 2021 after failing to attend council meetings for six months.  A by-election for the seat was held 18 March 2021. SNP candidate and former ward councillor David Turner won the seat.
††††††††† Shettleston ward SNP Cllr Michelle Ferns defected to the Alba Party on 29 March 2021.
 Maryhill ward SNP Cllr John Letford defected to the Alba Party on 29 April 2021.
 Partick East/Kelvindale ward Greens Cllr Martin Bartos resigned his party membership, while remaining as an independent councillor.

By-elections since 2017

References

2017
2017 Scottish local elections
2010s in Glasgow